Marc-Olivier Doué (born 11 October 2000) is a French professional footballer who plays as a defender for Challenger Pro League club Virton.

Club career
On 12 October 2018, he signed with the Dutch club PEC Zwolle until June 2021 with an additional one-year extension option.

He made his Eredivisie debut for PEC Zwolle on 25 August 2019 in a game against Sparta Rotterdam.

On 12 August 2021, he moved to the Belgian club Virton.

Personal life
Born in France, Doué is of Ivorian descent. His cousins Guéla and Désiré Doué, and Yann Gboho are also professional footballers.

References

External links
 

2000 births
Footballers from Bordeaux
Living people
French footballers
French sportspeople of Ivorian descent
Association football defenders
PEC Zwolle players
R.E. Virton players
Eredivisie players
Challenger Pro League players
French expatriate footballers
Expatriate footballers in the Netherlands
French expatriate sportspeople in the Netherlands
Expatriate footballers in Belgium
French expatriate sportspeople in Belgium